Heterocerus unicus is a species in the family Heteroceridae ("variegated mud-loving beetles"), in the order Coleoptera ("beetles").
The distribution range of Heterocerus unicus includes Central America and North America.

References

Further reading
 Arnett, R.H. Jr., M. C. Thomas, P. E. Skelley and J. H. Frank. (eds.). (2002). American Beetles, Volume II: Polyphaga: Scarabaeoidea through Curculionoidea. CRC Press LLC, Boca Raton, FL.
 Miller, W. V. (1988). "Two new species of Heterocerus from North America, with notes on related species (Coleoptera: Heteroceridae)". The Coleopterists Bulletin, vol. 42, no. 4, 313–320.
 Richard E. White. (1983). Peterson Field Guides: Beetles. Houghton Mifflin Company.
 Ross H. Arnett. (2000). American Insects: A Handbook of the Insects of America North of Mexico. CRC Press.

External links
NCBI Taxonomy Browser, Heterocerus unicus

Byrrhoidea
Beetles described in 1988